Joshua Ritchie may refer to:

Joshua H. Ritchie (born 1938), American-Israeli Rabbi and doctor
Josh Ritchie, British reality-TV personality